Fairbank is an underground light rail transit (LRT) station under construction on Line 5 Eglinton, a new line that is part of the Toronto subway system. It will be located in the Fairbank neighbourhood at the intersection of Dufferin Street and Eglinton Avenue West. Destinations include the Fairbank neighbourhood and Fairbank Memorial Park. , construction work related to the station was in progress, having been scheduled to begin in 2014. The station is scheduled to open in 2023.

During the planning stages for Line 5 Eglinton, the station was given the working name "Dufferin", which is identical to the pre-existing Dufferin station on Line 2 Bloor–Danforth. On November 23, 2015, a report to the TTC Board recommended giving a unique name to each station in the subway system (including Line 5 Eglinton). Thus, the LRT station was renamed "Fairbank" after the Fairbank neighbourhood rather than the intersecting Dufferin Street.

The main entrance will replace the Esso gas station on the east side of St. Hilda's Park, at the southeast corner of Dufferin Street and Eglinton Avenue. A secondary entrance will be on the northwest corner, where a right-turn slip road will be removed to provide the necessary space. A third structure, for mechanical and venting purposes, will replace a storefront near the southwest corner. Fairbank station will include a decorative exterior plaza having grass, a misting feature, 14 shade trees, 15 benches and 10 bicycle parking spaces. It will be suitable for community events.

Surface connections 

, the following are the proposed connecting routes that would serve this station when Line 5 Eglinton opens:

References

External links
Dufferin Station project page at the Eglinton Crosstown website.
 

Line 5 Eglinton stations